Monona is a city in Dane County, Wisconsin, United States. A suburb of the state capital, Madison, the city lies on the southeastern shore of Lake Monona, from which the city gets its name. The population was 8,624 at the 2020 census.

History
Originally part of the Town of Blooming Grove, Monona was incorporated as a village on August 29, 1938.  Prior to 1938, the area mainly consisted of farmland and summer homes. However, by 1938, permanent homes and small businesses had become much more common in the area. During the 1950s, Monona grew in population from 2,544 to 8,178.

In 1963, Monona built a community center and adjacent swimming pool. In 1967, a public library was built. In 1969, when Monona incorporated as a city, a city hall was built across from the library. It houses all city operations, including the fire and police departments.

Indian mound discovery

During the 1940s, a mound was cut into during street construction and skeletons were uncovered. This Indian burial mound was thought to have been built around 1,500 years ago by the Hopewell Indians A Wisconsin historical marker was placed at this site in 1998, inscribed with the following:

The Outlet Mound
"The largest of 19 conical, oval and linear mounds once located in this vicinity, the Outlet Mound was built by Woodland Indians about 2,000 years ago. Constructed as a burial place, the mound was saved from destruction by the Wisconsin Archeological Society and local citizens in 1944 and donated to the City of Monona."

The area where the mound was discovered, now known as Indian Mounds Park, is located at the corner of Midwood and Ridgewood Avenues.

It was added to the National Register of Historic Places in 2003.

Geography
Monona is located at  (43.057029, -89.333716).

Demographics

2010 census
As of the census of 2010, there were 7,533 people, 3,777 households, and 1,925 families living in the city. The racial makeup of the city was 92.5% White, 2.8% African American, 0.5% Native American, 1.4% Asian, 1.1% from other races, and 1.7% from two or more races. Hispanic or Latino of any race were 3.1% of the population.

There were 3,777 households, of which 20.0% had children under the age of 18 living with them, 40.0% were married couples living together, 8.2% had a female householder with no husband present, 2.8% had a male householder with no wife present, and 49.0% were non-families. 40.9% of all households were made up of individuals, and 15.6% had someone living alone who was 65 years of age or older. The average household size was 1.99 and the average family size was 2.71.

The median age in the city was 45.9 years. 16.9% of residents were under the age of 18; 6.7% were between the ages of 18 and 24; 24.9% were from 25 to 44; 32% were from 45 to 64; and 19.5% were 65 years of age or older. The gender makeup of the city was 47.7% male and 52.3% female.

2007 Demographics
The city population as of 2007 is 8,046 with a growth of +.0.3% since 2000.  3,838 residents (47.7%) are male and 4,208 residents (52.3%) are female.  The median resident age is 41.3 years of age, slightly older than the average Wisconsin resident at 36 years.  The reported racial makeup is 92.0% White, 3.2% Hispanic, 2.3% Black, 1.5% two or more races, 1.3% other race, and 0.8% American Indian.

2000 City census information
As of the census of 2000, there were 3,768 households, and 2,053 families living in the city. The population density was 2,387.5 people per square mile (921.4/km2). There were 3,922 housing units at an average density of 1,167.8 per square mile (450.7/km2).

There were 3,768 households, out of which 23.9% had children under the age of 18 living with them, 43.3% were married couples living together, 8.2% had a female householder with no husband present, and 45.5% were non-families. 37.0% of all households were made up of individuals, and 13.8% had someone living alone who was 65 years of age or older. The average household size was 2.12 and the average family size was 2.80.

In the city, the population was spread out, with 20.5% under the age of 18, 6.8% from 18 to 24, 28.8% from 25 to 44, 26.3% from 45 to 64, and 17.6% who were 65 years of age or older. The median age was 41 years. For every 100 females, there were 91.2 males. For every 100 females age 18 and over, there were 88.1 males.

The median income for a household in the city was $48,034, and the median income for a family was $58,635. Males had a median income of $40,267 versus $30,912 for females. The per capita income for the city was $26,072. About 2.2% of families and 5.7% of the population were below the poverty line, including 5.9% of those under age 18 and 3.1% of those age 65 or over.

Economy
The Sand County Foundation is located in Monona, as is the Widen software company.

References

External links

 City of Monona
 Monona Chamber of Commerce

Cities in Wisconsin
Cities in Dane County, Wisconsin
Populated places established in 1938
1938 establishments in Wisconsin